KD Tun Abdul Razak is a Scorpène-class submarine of Royal Malaysian Navy.

Development and design 
In 2002, Malaysia ordered two Scorpène-class boats worth €1.04 billion (about RM4.78 billion). Both boats Tunku Abdul Rahman and Tun Abdul Razak commissioned by Royal Malaysian Navy in 2009.

The Scorpène class of submarines has four subtypes: the CM-2000 conventional diesel-electric version, the AM-2000 air-independent propulsion (AIP) derivative, the downsized CA-2000 coastal submarine, and the enlarged S-BR for the Brazilian Navy, without AIP.

Construction and career
She is laid down on 25 April 2005 and launched in October 2008. She is commissioned in December 2009 and. She was assigned at Sepanggar Naval Base, Sabah.

Gallery

References

Scorpène-class submarines of the Royal Malaysian Navy
Attack submarines
Ships built in France
Ships built in Spain
2008 ships
Submarines of Malaysia